Hussein Mahmoud Hassan el-Shafei (8 February 1918 – 18 November 2005), was a member of Egypt's 1952 revolutionary leadership council and served as vice president under two Egyptian presidents, Gamal Abdel Nasser and Anwar Sadat. He was one of the nine men who had constituted themselves as the committee of the Free Officers Movement, led the country's cavalry corps during the uprising and was one of only three living members of the Revolutionary Command Council at the time of his death.

Early life and education
Born in Tanta in 1918, el-Shafei graduated from the Egyptian Military Academy in 1938.

Career

El-Shafei was appointed minister of war in 1954 and served as Egypt's minister of labor and social affairs during Egypt's merger with Syria. He served as vice-president under Gamal Abdel Nasser in 1961.

During his tenure as minister of social affairs, el-Shafei introduced social insurance reforms considered radical at the time, including pensions to widows. His Winter Charity campaign provided Egypt's poor with basic necessities. Some Egyptian celebrities took part in the "mercy trains" which delivered the goods, including actress Faten Hamama.

Anwar Sadat appointed el-Shafei as vice-president of Egypt's new government in 1971 and he was succeeded by Hosni Mubarak in April 1975.

Death
El-Shafei died on 18 November 2005. Mubarak was among the senior officials at el-Shafei's state funeral.

Honour
 Egypt: Grand Cordon of the Order of the Nile

Foreign honour
 Poland: Grand Cross of the Order of Polonia Restituta (1965)
 Malaysia: Honorary Grand Commander of the Order of the Defender of the Realm (1965)

See also
1952 Revolution

References

External links

1918 births
2005 deaths
Free Officers Movement (Egypt)
Egyptian revolutionaries
Vice-presidents of Egypt
Egyptian Military Academy alumni
Egyptian nationalists
People from Tanta
Arab Socialist Union (Egypt) politicians
Recipients of the Order of the Defender of the Realm
Social affairs ministers of Egypt
Labour ministers of Egypt
War ministers of Egypt
Planning ministers of Egypt
Endowments Ministers of Egypt
Grand Crosses of the Order of Polonia Restituta

Egyptian colonels